Life Is a Song Worth Singing is the second studio album by American recording artist Teddy Pendergrass, released on June 2, 1978 by Philadelphia International Records and Sony Music Entertainment.

The album contained two singles: "Only You" and "Close the Door". "Close The Door" reached number one on the US Billboard R&B music chart. The ballads "It Don't Hurt Now" and "When Somebody Loves You Back" became synonymous with the Quiet storm radio format. The album peaked at number 11 on the US Billboard 200 and peaked at number one on the US Billboard R&B chart. It was nominated for Favorite Soul/R&B Album at the sixth annual American Music Awards in 1979.

The title track is a cover of the Johnny Mathis hit single "Life Is a Song Worth Singing", which was released in 1973. The album was arranged by Jack Faith, Dexter Wansel, John L. Usry Jnr. and Thom Bell.

Track listing 
All tracks composed by Kenny Gamble and Leon Huff; except where indicated
 "Life Is a Song Worth Singing" (Thom Bell, Linda Creed)
 "Only You"
 "Cold, Cold World" (Victor Carstarphen, Gene McFadden, John Whitehead)
 "Get Up, Get Down, Get Funky, Get Loose"
 "Close the Door"
 "It Don't Hurt Now" (Sherman Marshall, Ted Wortham)
 "When Somebody Loves You Back"

Charts

Singles

See also
List of number-one R&B albums of 1978 (U.S.)

References

External links
 Teddy Pendergrass-Life Is A Song Worth Singing  at Discogs

1978 albums
Teddy Pendergrass albums
Albums produced by Kenneth Gamble
Albums produced by Leon Huff
Albums arranged by Thom Bell
Albums recorded at Sigma Sound Studios
Philadelphia International Records albums